Kaushalya Bannerji (born Calcutta) is a Canadian poet, visual artist and occasional essayist.

A resident of Toronto since the 1970s, Kaushalya Bannerji is the daughter of sociologist, philosopher and professor Himani Bannerji and professor, translator and writer, Manabendra Bandyopadhyay (1938-2020). In her pioneering article "A Lotus of Another Color", she delved into the cultural complexities sexuality adds to one's sense of self, especially coming from a socially conservative society. To Bannerji, this dilemma is enhanced by the willingness of many lesbians of the global South to keep their cultural identity and roots,  while confronting jaundiced/misogynist and lesphobic opinions that their societies may have about sexuality.

In her blog Ear to the Ground, Kaushalya Bannerji shares her own musings, poetry, and visual creations as well as those of other multidisciplinary artists.  Her visual art is available to view and for sale on Instagram. https://www.instagram.com/kaushalyabannerji/

Selected bibliography
1993: "No Apologies" in A Lotus of Another Color: An Unfolding of the South Asian Gay and Lesbian Experience, ed. Rakesh Ratti (Boston: Alyson Publications, Inc.) 59–64.
1995: A New Remembrance: Poems, (Toronto: TSAR).
1996: Pearls of Passion: A Treasury of Lesbian Erotica (Ed. Makeda Silvera et al.) (Toronto: Sistervision Press)
1998: 
2007: Let the Guitar Raise Her Hand, Selected Lyrics of Silvio Rodriguez (Translation from Spanish) (Kolkata: Tarjama Press)
2012: Grandfather's Kingdom, the Prose Poems of Josefina de Diego (Translation from Spanish) (Kolkata:Tarjama Press)

References

External links
 

Year of birth missing (living people)
Living people
Canadian non-fiction writers
20th-century Canadian poets
20th-century Canadian women writers
21st-century Canadian poets
Canadian women poets
Canadian writers of Asian descent
Canadian people of Bengali descent
Indian emigrants to Canada
Canadian lesbian writers
Naturalized citizens of Canada
Writers from Kolkata
Writers from Toronto
Canadian LGBT poets
Bengali Hindus
20th-century Bengalis
21st-century Bengalis
Bengali writers
Canadian Hindus
21st-century Canadian women writers
Canadian women non-fiction writers
Bengali artists
Bengali women artists
21st-century Canadian LGBT people
20th-century Canadian LGBT people